Baiju Santhosh Kumar, commonly referred to as Baiju, is an Indian actor who works in Malayalam films. He began his acting career in 1981, as a child artist in the film Maniyan Pilla Adhava Maniyan Pilla. Since then he has acted in more than 300 films.

Acting career
He began acting at the age of 10 debuting in Balachandra Menon-directed film Maniyan Pilla Adhava Maniyan Pilla in 1981. He has mostly done character roles and comedy roles.

He got a career breakthrough with the film Puthan Panam directed by Ranjith. His portrayal of Stephen Achayan in Ente Mezhuthiri Athazhangal was critically acclaimed.

In 2019, he did lead role in Nadirshah's Mera Naam Shaji along with Asif Ali and Biju Menon.

Personal life
Baiju Santhosh Kumar hails from Thiruvananthapuram. 
He is born to Bhaskaran Nair and Thankamma as single child.
He married Ranjitha in 1995. The couple has a daughter, Aishwarya and a son, Lokanath. Currently he resides in Thiruvananthapuram with his family.

Selected filmography

As child artist

As actor

As voice actor

Television
Comedy Stars Season 2 (Asianet) - Judge
 Bhamini Tholkarilla (2009)(Asianet)
 Suryaputhri (2005) (Asianet)
 Swami Ayyappan (2007)(Asianet)
 Parasparam (2000-2001) (Surya TV)
 Kadamattathu Kathanar (2004) (Asianet)

References

External links

Indian male film actors
Male actors from Thiruvananthapuram
Living people
Male actors in Malayalam cinema
20th-century Indian male actors
21st-century Indian male actors
Indian male child actors
Male actors in Malayalam television
1971 births